Accutone Technologies Limited is a manufacturer and marketer of telephone headsets for call centers, and premium-grade consumer audio headphones for smartphones and music-playing devices. A UK brand with headquarters in Spain, Mexico, Hong Kong, and manufacturing facilities in China, Accutone also builds ODM headsets for UK telecom companies, as well as telco in S.America and US.

Its mother company started out manufacturing loudspeakers in 1969, Accutone has been in the field of electro-acoustics for more than 45 years. Aside from being one of the big four business headset brand globally, Accutone has begun building a wide range of pro-grade audio headphones for consumers since 2011.

Headsets for Call Centers
The business unit of Accutone builds headsets for office and call centres, ranging from telephone connection to VoIP connection. They are one of the few brands to supply Unified Communication (UC) Headsets in the market, supporting Microsoft Lync platform. With the expected continual growth of demand for headset in the global contact center and office market, a research showed that Accutone is a key contributor amongst only a handful of brands.

Consumer Audio Headphones
At the retail level, the Accutone brand is associated with a wide series of audio headphones, ranging from in-ear to over-the-head size and bluetooth headphones. Features like bass-tuning ability, usage of beryllium speakers, magnetic detachable cable, audio nozzle kits and dual-wear methods set them apart from other brands. Accutone has partnership with American company Comply to supply all their pro-line products with premium memory foam tips to improve bass performance.

Ergonomics

Along with other developers like Plantronics, work safety is one of the primary concerns promoted by Accutone. They have in the past been highly involved in educating office workers in headset ergonomics.

References

Other references
 Accutone's Official Site
 Accutone Audio's News Blog
 Accutone Biz's News Blog
 Taurus Reviews in Japan's AV Watch
 TMCnet's review on Accutone's USB500 Headset
 British Telecom Business Direct for Accutone
 Advertisement for USB500

Electronics companies of the United Kingdom